Shock humour is a style of comedy intended to shock the audience. This can be achieved through excessively foul toilet humour, overt sexual themes, mocking of serious themes (otherwise known as black comedy), or through tactlessness in the aftermath of a crisis.

In radio, shock jocks use this brand of humour. In conservative communities, such risque broadcasting can cause controversy, such as Jim Quinn and Don Jefferson's "Stupid Human Tricks" segment of their late-1980s WBZZ-FM show.

Proponents of shock humour include Andrew Dice Clay, Tom Green, and Eric André. The television shows The Ren & Stimpy Show, South Park, Family Guy, Superjail!, Jackass, Drawn Together, Panty & Stocking with Garterbelt, Rick and Morty, Beavis and Butt-Head and Da Ali G Show have also been described as shock humour.

See also
 Low culture
 Shock value

References

Comedy genres